Thomas Bland (1830–1908) was an American physician and activist.

Thomas Bland may also refer to:

Sir Thomas Bland, 1st baronet (1614–1657) of the Bland baronets
Sir Thomas Bland, 3rd baronet (1662–1668) of the Bland baronets
Thomas Bland (British physician), father of Rivett Henry Bland
Thomas Bland (British Army officer) on List of British Army full generals

See also